The Baltic Appeal (or Baltiešu memorands) was a public letter to the general secretary of the United Nations, Soviet Union, East and West Germany, and signatories of the Atlantic Charter by 45 Estonian, Latvian and Lithuanian citizens. Sent on 23 August 1979, the 40th anniversary of the Molotov–Ribbentrop pact, the appeal demanded public disclosure of the pact and its secret protocols, annulment of the pact ab initio, and restoration of the independence of the Baltic states, then occupied by the Soviet Union.

The appeal was published in the foreign press and constituted the basis for the European Parliament's resolution of 13 January 1983 in support of its demands.  In Soviet-controlled territory, it was widespread through samizdat.

Signatories:
 
 Romas Andrijauskas
 Stase Andrijauskiene
 Alfonsas Andriukaitis
 Vytautas Bastys
 Vytautas Bogušis
 Vladas Bobinas
 Romas Vitkevičius
 Jonas Volungevičius
 Jonas Dambrauskas
 Romas Eišvydas
 Rimas Žukovskas
 Ivars Žukovskis
 Alfrēds Zaideks
 Juris Ziemelis
 Liutauras Kazakevičius
 Leonas Laurinskas
 Valdis Larius
 Algirdas Mocius
 Mart-Olav Niklus
 Napoleonas Norkūnas
 Uldis Ofkants
 Sigitas Paulavičius
 Angele Paškauskiene
 Jonas Pratusevičius
 Jadvyga Petkevičiene
 Jonas Petkevičius
 Fēlikss Nikmanis
 Sigitas Randys
 Endel Ratas
 Henrikas Sambora
 Julius Sasnauskas
 Leonora Sasnauskaite
 Algis Statkevičius
 Kestutis Subačius
 Enn Tarto
 Antanas Terleckas
 Erik Udam
 Ints Cālītis
 Petras Cidzikas
 Arvydas Čekanavičius
 Vladas Šakalys
 Jonas Šerkšnas
 Zigmas Širvinskas
 Mečislovas Jurevičius
 Virgilijus Jaugelis

See also 
 MRP-AEG

References 

 Estonian Ministry of Foreign Affairs 2006: Fact sheet on the Molotov-Ribbentrop pact and its consequences

1979 in international relations
History of the Baltic states
Cold War documents